This is the solo discography of Scottish singer-songwriter Fish.

Albums

Studio albums

Live albums

Compilation albums

Video albums

EPs

Singles

Notes

References

Discographies of British artists
Rock music discographies